Guntur Ariyadi (born 18 March 1987) is an Indonesian professional footballer who plays as a defender for Liga 1 club Madura United.

Honours

Club

Persik Kediri
 Liga Indonesia Premier Division: 2006
Barito Putera
 Liga Indonesia Premier Division: 2011-12

References

External links
 Guntur Ariyadi at Soccerway
 Guntur Ariyadi at Liga Indonesia

1987 births
Living people
Liga 1 (Indonesia) players
Persik Kediri players
Persema Malang players
PS Barito Putera players
Madura United F.C. players
Sportspeople from East Java
People from Banyuwangi Regency
Association football defenders
Indonesian footballers
21st-century Indonesian people